Île aux Pigeons (French: Pigeon Island; formerly called Île Canaille) is a small uninhabited island located about  off the coast of Saint-Pierre and Miquelon, a self-governing territorial overseas collectivity of France and the last remaining part of New France in North America.

Île aux Pigeons is covered with short grass and is shaped roughly like a diamond with a rocky coast.

Maps from the 17th century show the island as having been named Isle Canaille or Isle de Canaille. Its current name appears by the end of the 18th century. The island is uninhabited, but Edgar Aubert de la Rüe wrote that a farm may have existed once on site.

References 

Islands of Saint Pierre and Miquelon
Uninhabited islands of France